Gloria Laura Vanderbilt (February 20, 1924 – June 17, 2019) was an American artist, author, actress, fashion designer, heiress, and socialite.

During the 1930s, she was the subject of a high-profile child custody trial in which her mother, Gloria Morgan Vanderbilt, and her paternal aunt, Gertrude Vanderbilt Whitney, each sought custody of her and control over her trust fund. Called the "trial of the century" by the press, the court proceedings were the subject of wide and sensational press coverage due to the wealth and prominence of the involved parties, and the scandalous evidence presented to support Whitney's claim that Gloria Morgan Vanderbilt was an unfit parent.

In the 1970s, Vanderbilt launched a line of fashions, perfumes, and household goods bearing her name. She was particularly noted as an early developer of designer blue jeans.

Early life
Vanderbilt was born on February 20, 1924, in Manhattan, New York City, the only child of railroad heir Reginald Claypoole Vanderbilt of the Vanderbilt family and his second wife, Gloria Morgan Vanderbilt. When Vanderbilt was born, her father was heard to exclaim in delight, "It is fantastic how Vanderbilt she looks! See the corners of her eyes, how they turn up?" She was baptized in the Episcopal Church by Bishop Herbert Shipman as Gloria Laura Vanderbilt. After her father's death, she was confirmed and raised in the Catholic Church, to which her mother belonged. From her father's first marriage to Cathleen Neilson, she had one elder half-sister, Cathleen Vanderbilt.

Upon their father's death from cirrhosis when Vanderbilt was 18 months old, she and her half-sister became heiresses to a half share each in a $5 million trust fund, equivalent to $ million in  value. The control of Vanderbilt's share while she was a minor belonged to her mother, who traveled to and from Paris for years, taking her daughter with her. They were accompanied by a beloved nanny—Emma Sullivan Kieslich, whom young Gloria had named "Dodo"—who would play a tumultuous part in the child's life, and her mother's identical twin sister, Thelma, who was the lover of the Prince of Wales (later Edward VIII) during this time. As a result of her spending habits, her mother's use of finances was scrutinized by the child's paternal aunt, Gertrude Vanderbilt Whitney.  A sculptor and philanthropist, Whitney wanted custody of her niece, which resulted in a custody trial. The trial was so scandalous that at times the judge would make everyone leave the room so as to listen to what young Vanderbilt had to say without anyone influencing her. Some people heard weeping and wailing inside the court room. Testimony was heard depicting Vanderbilt's mother as an unfit parent, including an allegation from Marie Caillot, her discharged French maid, of a lesbian affair with the Marchioness of Milford Haven, a relative of the British royal family, which Lady Milford Haven would subsequently deny in her own testimony. Vanderbilt's mother lost the battle and Vanderbilt became the ward of her aunt Gertrude.

Litigation continued, however. Vanderbilt's mother was forced to live on a drastically reduced portion of her daughter's trust, which was worth more than $4 million at the end of 1937, equivalent to $ million in  value. Visitation was also closely watched to ensure that Vanderbilt's mother did not exert any undue influence upon her daughter with her supposedly "raucous" lifestyle. Vanderbilt was raised amidst luxury at her aunt Gertrude's mansion in Old Westbury, Long Island, surrounded by cousins her age who lived in houses circling the vast estate, and in New York City.

The story of the trial was told in the 1980 Barbara Goldsmith book Little Gloria... Happy at Last and a 1982 NBC miniseries based on it, which was nominated for six Emmy Awards and a Golden Globe Award. Actress Jennifer Dundas played Gloria.

Vanderbilt attended the Greenvale School on Long Island; Miss Porter's School in Farmington, Connecticut; and then the Wheeler School in Providence, Rhode Island, as well as the Art Students League in New York City, developing the artistic talent for which she would become increasingly known during her career. When Vanderbilt came of age and took control of her trust fund, she cut her mother off entirely, though they later were reconciled. Her mother died in Los Angeles in 1965.

Career

Theater arts
From 1954 to 1963, Vanderbilt applied herself to acting. She studied acting at the Neighborhood Playhouse with teacher Sanford Meisner and debuted in 1954 in The Swan, staged at Pocono Playhouse in Mountainhome, Pennsylvania. In 1955 she appeared on Broadway as Elsie in a revival of William Saroyan's The Time of Your Life. Vanderbilt also appeared in a number of live and filmed television dramas including Playhouse 90, Studio One in Hollywood and The Dick Powell Show. She made an appearance in a two-part episode of The Love Boat in 1981. Other TV programs on which she appeared include Person to Person with Edward R. Murrow, The Tonight Show Starring Johnny Carson, The Oprah Winfrey Show, Live! with Kelly and Michael and CBS News Sunday Morning.

Fashion 
Vanderbilt began her career as a fashion model when she was 15 years old, appearing in Harper's Bazaar.

During the 1970s, Vanderbilt ventured into the fashion business itself, first with Glentex, licensing her name and a collection of her paintings for a line of scarves. In 1976, Indian designer Mohan Murjani's Murjani Corporation proposed launching a line of designer jeans carrying Vanderbilt's signature embroidered on the back pocket, as well as her swan logo. Her jeans were more tightly fitted than other jeans of that time and were an immediate success with customers.

In 1978, Vanderbilt sold the rights to her name to the Murjani Group and re-launched her own company, GV Ltd, which she had founded in 1976. With her company, she launched dresses, blouses, sheets, shoes, leather goods, liqueurs, and accessories. In the period from 1982 to 2002, L'Oreal launched eight fragrances under the brand name Gloria Vanderbilt. Murjan sold rights to the name Gloria Vanderbilt to the owners of Gitano Group Inc. in 1988.

Jones Apparel Group acquired the rights to Gloria Vanderbilt jeans in 2002.

Fraud trial
In the 1980s, Vanderbilt accused her former partners in GV Ltd. and her lawyer of fraud. After a lengthy trial (during which time the lawyer died), Vanderbilt won and was awarded nearly $1.7 million, but the money was never recovered.
She was also awarded $300,000 by the New York City Bar Association. Vanderbilt also owed millions of dollars in back taxes, since the lawyer had never paid the IRS, and she was forced to sell her Southampton, New York and Upper East Side homes.

Art 
Vanderbilt studied art at the Art Students League of New York. She became known for her artwork, with one-woman exhibitions held of her oil paintings, watercolors, and pastels. Her first exhibition was held in 1948. This artwork was adapted and licensed, starting about 1968, by Hallmark Cards and by Bloomcraft (a textile manufacturer), and Vanderbilt began designing specifically for linen, pottery, and glassware.

In 2001, Vanderbilt returned to art and opened her first art exhibition, "Dream Boxes", at the Southern Vermont Arts Center in Manchester; it was a critical success. She launched another exhibition of 35 paintings at the Arts Center in 2007. Two years later, Vanderbilt returned to the Arts Center as a panelist at its Annual Fall Show Exhibition, signing copies of her latest novel, Obsession: An Erotic Tale.

When Vanderbilt celebrated her 90th birthday on February 20, 2014, a collection of her drawings, paintings and collages was placed on display in the 1stdibs Gallery at New York Design Center in New York City, in an exhibit called "The Left Hand Is The Dreamer".

Writings
Vanderbilt wrote two books on art and home decor, four volumes of memoirs, three novels, and a singular collection of short stories The Things We Fear Most. She was also a regular contributor to The New York Times, Vanity Fair and Elle. In November 2010, Vanderbilt was the subject of a new book chronicling her life, The World of Gloria Vanderbilt, written by Wendy Goodman, New York magazine's design editor. The book, published by Abrams Books, featured many previously unreleased photographs.

In January 2017, HarperCollins Publishers released a book, coauthored by Vanderbilt and her son Anderson Cooper, The Rainbow Comes and Goes: A Mother and Son on Life, Love, and Loss. The book was described by its publisher as: "A touching and intimate correspondence between Anderson Cooper and his mother, Gloria Vanderbilt, offering timeless wisdom and a revealing glimpse into their lives".

Nothing Left Unsaid documentary
On April 9, 2016, HBO premiered Nothing Left Unsaid: Gloria Vanderbilt & Anderson Cooper, a two-hour documentary, produced and directed by Liz Garbus. It features a series of conversations between the mother and son, covering her life and family history in the public eye.

Personal life
Vanderbilt was married four times, divorced three times, and gave birth to four sons, in all. She also had other relationships.

Marriages
In 1941, aged 17, Vanderbilt went to Hollywood, where she became the second wife of Pat DiCicco, an agent for actors and an alleged mobster. They divorced in 1945 and had no children together. She later alleged that DiCicco was an abusive husband who called her "Fatsy Roo" and beat her. "He would take my head and bang it against the wall," Vanderbilt said, "I had black eyes."

In April 1945, within weeks of divorcing DiCicco, Vanderbilt married conductor Leopold Stokowski, who was 42 years her senior. He had three daughters by his previous marriages to Olga Samaroff, an American concert pianist, and Evangeline Love Brewster Johnson, a Johnson & Johnson heiress. She was his third and last wife. The marriage ended in divorce in October 1955 and produced two sons: Leopold Stanislaus "Stan" Stokowski (born August 22, 1950), and Christopher Stokowski (born January 31, 1952). Stan has three children; Christopher has no children.

Vanderbilt's third husband was the director Sidney Lumet. She was the second of his four wives. They were married on August 28, 1956, and divorced in August 1963. They had no children together.

Vanderbilt's fourth marriage was to author Wyatt Emory Cooper, on December 24, 1963. The marriage, which lasted 15 years, ended with his death in 1978 while he was undergoing open-heart surgery. They had two sons: Carter Vanderbilt Cooper (January 27, 1965 – July 22, 1988), who died by suicide at age 23 by jumping to his death from the family's 14th-floor apartment, and Anderson Hays Cooper (born June 3, 1967), a CNN news anchor.

Relationships
Vanderbilt maintained a romantic relationship with photographer and filmmaker Gordon Parks for many years until his death in 2006. Other relationships included Marlon Brando, Frank Sinatra, Howard Hughes and Roald Dahl.

Vanderbilt was very close friends with fashion designer Diane von Fürstenberg. While appearing as a guest on her son Anderson Cooper's television talk show, Anderson on September 19, 2011, Vanderbilt referred to comedian and actress Kathy Griffin as her "fantasy daughter".

Truman Capote was speculated to have modeled the character of Holly Golightly in Breakfast at Tiffany's on Vanderbilt, but others say it was based on her friend Carol Grace.

Religious beliefs
Vanderbilt was baptized into the Episcopal Church as an infant, but was raised a Roman Catholic and as a child was particularly fascinated with St. Therese. Although religious in her youth, she was not a practicing Catholic in her later years.

Death and burial
Vanderbilt died at her home in Manhattan on June 17, 2019, aged 95, of stomach cancer.  She is buried next to her son Carter and late husband Wyatt in the Cooper plot in the Vanderbilt Family Cemetery on Staten Island, New York.

Upon her death, Vanderbilt left her son, Anderson Cooper, almost her entire estate, which was valued at less than $1.5 million.

Works

Art and home decor

Memoirs

Novels

References

Citations

Sources

External links

 
 
 
 "Gloria Vanderbilt's Many Loves". CBS News. July 31, 2005
 "CBC's Q with Jian Ghomeshi", July 30, 2012

1924 births
2019 deaths
American socialites
American fashion designers
Clothing brands
Jeans by brand
American company founders
American women company founders
American women business executives
Businesspeople from New York City
20th-century American businesspeople
21st-century American businesspeople
American memoirists
American women memoirists
American women novelists
Novelists from New York (state)
20th-century American novelists
21st-century American novelists
21st-century American non-fiction writers
20th-century American women writers
21st-century American women writers
Writers from New York City
American television actresses
20th-century American actresses
21st-century American actresses
Actresses from New York City
Gloria
20th-century American trials
Anderson Cooper
1970s fashion
1980s fashion
American debutantes
Art Students League of New York alumni
Miss Porter's School alumni
People from Nassau County, New York
Catholics from New York (state)
Deaths from cancer in New York (state)
Deaths from stomach cancer
Lumet family
20th-century American businesswomen
21st-century American businesswomen
American people of Dutch descent
American women fashion designers
Burials at the Vanderbilt Family Cemetery and Mausoleum